Lorraine Twohill is an Irish marketer who is the CMO of Google.

Early life 
Lorraine Twohill is originally from Ireland. She attended Dublin City University and graduated with a joint honors degree in International Marketing and Languages. She currently lives in Palo Alto, California.

Career 
After graduation, Twohill worked as a brand manager for Burns Philp from 1992 to 1995. In 2000, she became the head of marketing at Dreamticket.com in London, and in 2001 she joined the European travel site Opodo also in the same role. In 2003, Twohill was hired as Google's first marketer located outside the United States. She held various roles in the company, including running Google's marketing efforts in Europe, the Middle East, and Africa. She ultimately was promoted to become head of global marketing in 2009.

Twohill served on the board of Williams-Sonoma, Inc. from January 2012 to May 2017, and was named Adweek’s Grand Brand Genius.

Twohill currently serves on the board of Palo Alto Networks since April 2019.

References 

20th-century Irish people
21st-century Irish people
Google employees
Williams-Sonoma people
Year of birth missing (living people)
Living people
Alumni of Dublin City University
Irish marketing people